Sinomicrurus sauteri (common names: Taiwan coral snake, oriental coral snake and Formosa coral snake) is a highly venomous species of coral snake in the family Elapidae.

Etymology
The specific name, sauteri, is in honor of German entomologist Hans Sauter (1871–1943).

Description
The upper side of the body is dark brown or crimson, and has three black longitudinal stripes from neck to tip of tail, of which the mid-dorsal stripe is narrower than the lateral ones.

Venom
Sinomicrurus sauteri is highly venomous. Although it is not aggressive and very few reports of attacks have been reported, its venom is potentially life-threatening.

Reproduction
Sinomicrurus sauteri is oviparous.

Habitat
Sinomicrurus sauteri may be found in forests or meadows in mountainous area at lower or middle altitudes. It is typically nocturnal.

Conservation status
S. sauteri is a rare species protected by the law. It is not considered threatened.

References

Further reading
Slowinski, Joseph B; Boundy, Jeff; Lawson, Robin (2001). "The Phylogenetic Relationships of Asian Coral Snakes (Elapidae: Calliophis and Maticora) Based on Morphological and Molecular Characters". Herpetologica 57 (2): 233-245. (Sinomicrurus sauteri, new combination).
Steindachner F (1913). "Über zwei neue Schlangenarten von Formosa ". Anzeiger der Kaiserlichen Akademie der Wissenschaften, Mathematisch-Naturwissenschaftliche Klasse 50: 218-220. (Oligodon sauteri, new species, pp. 219–220). (in German).

sauteri
Snakes of Asia
Reptiles of Taiwan
Endemic fauna of Taiwan
Reptiles described in 1913
Taxa named by Franz Steindachner